USS Memphis may refer to:

, was a wooden five-gun crew steamer chartered by the US Navy for the Paraguay expedition and renamed Mystic 14 June 1859
, was a civilian steamship purchased by the US Navy from a prize court 4 September 1862 and was decommissioned and sold 8 May 1869
, known for most of her career as Tennessee (ACR-10), was destroyed by heavy waves three months after she was renamed in 1916
, was an Omaha-class light cruiser, saw action in World War II
, was a  fleet oiler acquired by the US Navy 28 November 1956 and transferred to the US Army in 1967
, is a Los Angeles-class submarine launched 3 April 1976 and decommissioned in 2011
, was a Confederate steamer during the American Civil War

United States Navy ship names